Ana Marlene Forte Machado, better known as Marlene Forte, is a Cuban actress and producer. She is perhaps best known for her role as Carmen Ramos on the television soap opera Dallas (2012–2014). Forte also had recurring roles in Fear the Walking Dead, The Fosters and Altered Carbon. Her notable film credits including A Haunted House (2013), El Chicano (2018), Knives Out  (2019), and The Way Back (2020).

Life and career
Forte was born in Havana, Cuba. She studied English literature at Rutgers and education at Montclair State University. She has appeared in many independent films since the early 1990s. She received an Imagen Award nomination for performance in the 2008 film Little Girl Lost: The Delimar Vera Story.  On television, Forte appeared in recurring roles on Tyler Perry's House of Payne, Crossing Jordan, and The Secret Life of the American Teenager. Her film appearances include the transporter chief in the 2009 Star Trek reboot and Mrs. Glass in Real Women Have Curves.

In 2012, Forte was cast on TNT's revamped Dallas, playing Carmen Ramos, longtime Ewing family housekeeper and mother to Elena (played by Jordana Brewster). She played another housekeeper in the 2013 comedy film, A Haunted House, and co-starred in the Tyler Perry's The Single Moms Club (2014). After Dallas, Forte had recurring role as Elena Gutierrez in the ABC Family drama series, The Fosters from 2015 to 2017.

In 2016, Forte played Celia Flores, the main antagonist during the first half of season 2 of the AMC horror drama series, Fear the Walking Dead. In 2018, she was cast as Alazne Ortega for the first season of the Netflix science fiction drama series, Altered Carbon. Her other television credits include Claws, Mayans M.C., Runaways, Superstore and The Conners. Forte also played supporting roles in the 2018 superhero film El Chicano as Raúl Castillo's character' mother, 2019 mystery crime comedy Knives Out as Ana de Armas' mother, and 2020 drama film The Way Back. In 2021, she appeared in the Netflix vampire film Night Teeth.

In 2022, Forte starred and produced horror thriller film Hypochondriac that premiered at the South by Southwest festival.

Personal life
Forte married screenwriter Oliver Mayer in 2006. They live in Los Angeles, California. They have no children together, but Forte has daughter Giselle Rodriguez, who works as producer, from a previous relationship.

Filmography

Film

Television

References

External links
 
 

Living people
American entertainers of Cuban descent
American film actresses
American soap opera actresses
American television actresses
Cuban emigrants to the United States
People from Havana
20th-century American actresses
21st-century American actresses
1961 births